The Colorado Rockies are an American professional baseball team based in Denver. The Rockies compete in Major League Baseball (MLB) as a member club of the National League (NL) West division. The team plays its home baseball games at Coors Field, which is located in the Lower Downtown area of Denver. It is owned by the Monfort brothers and managed by Bud Black.

The Rockies began as an expansion team for the 1993 season and played their home games for their first two seasons at Mile High Stadium. Since 1995, they have played at Coors Field, which has earned a reputation as a hitter's park. The Rockies have qualified for the postseason five times, each time as a Wild Card winner. In 2007, the team earned its first (and only) NL pennant after winning 14 of their final 15 games in the regular season to secure a Wild Card position, capping the streak off with a 13-inning 9-8 victory against the San Diego Padres in the tiebreaker game affectionately known as "Game 163" by Rockies fans. The Rockies then proceeded to sweep the Philadelphia Phillies and Arizona Diamondbacks in the NLDS and NLCS and entered the 2007 World Series as winners of 21 of their last 22 games. However, they were swept by the American League (AL) champions Boston Red Sox in four games.

From 1993 to 2022, the Rockies have an overall record of 2,201–2,495 ( winning percentage).

History

Denver had long been a hotbed of Denver Bears / Zephyrs minor league baseball as far back as the late 19th century with the original Denver Bears (or Grizzlies) competing in the Western League before being replaced in 1955 by a AAA team of the same name. Residents and businesses in the area desired a Major League team. Denver's Mile High Stadium was built originally as Denver Bears Stadium, a minor league baseball stadium that could be upgraded to major league standards. Several previous attempts to bring Major League Baseball to Colorado had failed. In 1958, New York lawyer William Shea proposed the new Continental League as a rival to the two existing major leagues. In 1960, the Continental League announced that play would begin in April 1961 with eight teams, including one in Denver headed by Bob Howsam. The new league quickly evaporated, without ever playing a game, when the National League reached expansion agreements to put teams in New York City and Houston, removing much of the impetus behind the Continental League effort. Following the Pittsburgh drug trials in 1985, an unsuccessful attempt was made to purchase the Pittsburgh Pirates and relocate them. However, in January 1990, Colorado's chances for a new team improved when Coors Brewing Company became a limited partner with the AAA Denver Zephyrs.

In 1991, as part of Major League Baseball's two-team expansion (along with the Florida (now Miami) Marlins), an ownership group representing Denver led by John Antonucci and Michael I. Monus was granted a franchise. They took the name "Rockies" due to Denver's proximity to the Rocky Mountains, which is reflected in their logo; the name was previously used by the city's first NHL team (now the New Jersey Devils). Monus and Antonucci were forced to drop out in 1992 after Monus's reputation was ruined by an accounting scandal. Trucking magnate Jerry McMorris stepped in at the 11th hour to save the franchise, allowing the team to begin play in 1993. The Rockies shared Mile High Stadium with the National Football League (NFL)'s Denver Broncos for their first two seasons while Coors Field was constructed. It was completed for the 1995 Major League Baseball season.

In 1993, they began in the West division of the National League. That year the Rockies set the all-time Major League record for attendance, drawing an incredible 4,483,350 fans (a record that stands to this day). The Rockies were MLB's first team based in the Mountain Time Zone. They have reached the Major League Baseball postseason five times, each time as the National League wild card team. Twice (1995 and 2009), they were eliminated in the first round of the playoffs. In 2007, the Rockies advanced to the World Series, only to be swept by the Boston Red Sox. The team's stretch run was among the greatest ever for a Major League Baseball team. Having a record of 76-72 at the start of play on September 16, the Rockies proceeded to win 14 of their final 15 regular season games. The stretch culminated with a 9-8, 13-inning victory over the San Diego Padres in a one-game playoff for the wild card berth. Colorado then swept their first seven playoff games to win the NL pennant (thus, at the start of the World Series, the Rockies had won a total of 21 out of 22 games). Fans and media nicknamed their improbable run in October, Rocktober.

Colorado made postseason berths in 2017 and 2018. In 2018, the Rockies became the first team since the 1922 Philadelphia Phillies to play in four cities against four teams in five days, including the 162nd game of the regular season, NL West tie-breaker, NL Wild Card Game and NLDS Game 1, eventually losing to the Milwaukee Brewers in the NLDS.

Like their expansion brethren, the Miami Marlins, they have never won a division title since their establishment and they, along with the Pittsburgh Pirates are also one of three MLB teams that have never won their current division. The Rockies have played their home games at Coors Field since 1995. Their newest spring training home, Salt River Fields at Talking Stick in Scottsdale, Arizona, opened in March 2011 and is shared with the Arizona Diamondbacks.

Controversies 
On June 1, 2006, USA Today reported that Rockies management, including manager Clint Hurdle, had instituted an explicitly Christian code of conduct for the team's players, banning men's magazines (such as Maxim and Playboy) and sexually explicit music from the team's clubhouse. The article sparked controversy, and soon-after The Denver Post published an article featuring many Rockies players contesting the claims made in the USA Today article. Former Rockies pitcher Jason Jennings said: "[The article in USA Today] was just bad. I am not happy at all. Some of the best teammates I have ever had are the furthest thing from Christian", Jennings said. "You don't have to be a Christian to have good character. They can be separate. [The article] was misleading."

On October 17, 2007, a week before the first game of the 2007 World Series against the Boston Red Sox, the Colorado Rockies announced that tickets were to be available to the general public via online sales only, despite prior arrangements to sell the tickets at local retail outlets. Five days later on October 22, California-based ticket vendor Paciolan, Inc., the sole contractor authorized by the Colorado Rockies to distribute tickets, was forced to suspend sales after less than an hour due to an overwhelming number of attempts to purchase tickets. An official release from the baseball organization claimed that they were the victims of a denial of service attack. These claims, however, were unsubstantiated and neither the Rockies nor Paciolan have sought investigation into the matter. The United States Federal Bureau of Investigation started its own investigation into the claims. Ticket sales resumed the next day, with all three home games selling out within two and a half hours.

In March 2021, Ken Rosenthal and Nick Groke reported in The Athletic that, during the  season, the Rockies had made baseball operations personnel work as clubhouse attendants in addition to their front office duties, resulting in work days lasting up to 17 hours. Former staffers described doing laundry for players while team personnel asked them for scouting and statistical information. The article further described a general atmosphere of dysfunction and unaccountability in Colorado's front office. General manager Jeff Bridich resigned the following month.

Season record

Uniforms

One of the Rockies' team colors is purple which was inspired by the line "For purple mountain majesties" in "America the Beautiful." The shades of the color used by the ball club lacked uniformity until PMS 2685 was established as the official purple beginning with the 2017 season.

The Rockies' home uniform is white with purple pinstripes, and the Rockies are the first team in Major League history to wear purple pinstripes. The front of the uniform is emblazoned with the team name in silver trimmed in black, and letters and numerals are in black trimmed in silver. During the Rockies' inaugural season, they went without names on the back of their home uniforms, but added them for the following season. In 2000, numerals were added to the chest.

The Rockies' road uniform is grey with purple piping. The front of the uniform originally featured the team name in silver trimmed in purple, but was changed the next season to purple with white trim. Letters and numerals are in purple with white trim. In the 2000 season, piping was replaced with pinstripes, "Colorado" was emblazoned in front, chest numerals were placed, and black trim was added to the letters. Prior to the 2012 season, the Rockies brought back the purple piping on their road uniforms, but kept the other elements of their 2000 uniform change.

The Rockies originally wore an alternate black uniform during their maiden 1993 season, but for only a few games. The uniform featured the team name in silver with purple trim, and letters and numerals in purple with white trim. In the 2005 season, the Rockies started wearing black sleeveless alternate uniforms, featuring "Colorado", letters and numerals in silver with purple and white trim. The uniforms also included black undershirts, and for a few games in 2005, purple undershirts. 

From 2002 to 2011, the Rockies wore alternate versions of their pinstriped white uniform, featuring the interlocking "CR" on the left chest and numerals on the right chest. This design featured sleeves until 2004, when they went with a vest design with black undershirts.

In addition to the black sleeveless alternate uniform, the Rockies also wear a purple alternate uniform, which they first unveiled in the 2000 season. The design featured "Colorado" in silver with black and white trim, and letters and numerals in black with white trim. At the start of the 2012 season, the Rockies introduced "Purple Mondays" in which the team wears its purple uniform every Monday game day, though the team continued to wear them on other days of the week.

Prior to 2019, the Rockies always wore their white pinstriped pants regardless of what uniform top they wore during home games. However, the Rockies have since added alternate white non-pinstriped pants to pair with either their black or purple alternate uniforms at home, as neither uniform contained pinstripes.

The Rockies currently wear an all-black cap with "CR" in purple trimmed in silver and a purple-brimmed variation as an alternate. The team previously wore an all-purple cap with "CR" in black trimmed in silver, and in the 2018 season, caps with the "CR" in silver to commemorate the team's 25th anniversary.

In 2022, the Rockies were one of seven additional teams to don Nike's "City Connect" uniforms. The set is predominantly green and white with printed mountain range motifs adorning the chest. The lettering was taken from the official Colorado license plates. The right sleeve has a yellow patch featuring the shortened nickname "ROX", the "5280" sign representing the altitude of Denver, two black diamonds representing Double Diamond skiing, and the exact longitude and latitude of Coors Field. The left sleeve has the interlocking "CR" in white with green trim, and purple piping was added to represent purple seats at Coors Field. Caps are green with a white panel, featuring a "CO" patch with various Colorado-inspired symbols, including colors from the state flag and mountain ranges.

Baseball Hall of Famers

In 2020, Larry Walker was the first Colorado Rockies player to be inducted to the Baseball Hall of Fame.

Colorado Sports Hall of Fame

Retired numbers

Todd Helton is the first Colorado player to have his number (17) retired, which was done on Sunday, August 17, 2014.

Jackie Robinson's No. 42, was retired throughout all of baseball in 1997.

Keli McGregor had worked with the Rockies since their inception in 1993, rising from senior director of operations to team president in 2002, until his death on April 20, 2010. He is honored at Coors Field alongside Helton, Walker, and Robinson with his initials.

Out of Circulation, but not retired
The Rockies have not re-issued Carlos Gonzalez's No. 5 since leaving the team after 2018.

Individual awards

NL MVP
1997 – Larry Walker

NLCS MVP
2007 – Matt Holliday

NL Rookie of the Year
2002 – Jason Jennings

NL Comeback Player of the Year
2017 – Greg Holland
2020 – Daniel Bard

Silver Slugger Award

 Dante Bichette (1995)
 Vinny Castilla (1995, 1997–1998)
 Andrés Galarraga (1996) 
 Eric Young (1996)
 Ellis Burks (1996)
 Larry Walker (1997, 1999)
 Mike Hampton (2001–2002)
 Todd Helton (2000–2003)
 Matt Holliday (2006–2008)
 Carlos González (2010, 2015)
 Troy Tulowitzki (2010–2011)
 Michael Cuddyer (2013)
 Nolan Arenado (2015–2018)
 Charlie Blackmon (2016–2017)
 Trevor Story (2018–2019)
 Germán Márquez (2018)

Hank Aaron Award
2000 – Todd Helton

Gold Glove Award
First base:
 Todd Helton (2001–2002, 2004)
Second base:
 DJ LeMahieu (2014, 2017–2018)
 Brendan Rodgers (2022)
Shortstop:
 Neifi Pérez (2000)
 Troy Tulowitzki (2010–2011)
Third base:
 Nolan Arenado (2013–2020)
Outfield:
 Larry Walker (1997–1999, 2001–2002)
 Carlos González (2010, 2012–2013)

Manager of the Year Award
1995 – Don Baylor
2009 – Jim Tracy

NL Batting Champion 
 Andrés Galarraga (1993)
 Larry Walker (1998, 1999, 2001)
 Todd Helton (2000)
 Matt Holliday (2007)
 Carlos González (2010)
 Michael Cuddyer (2013)
 Justin Morneau (2014)
 DJ LeMahieu (2016)
 Charlie Blackmon (2017)

DHL Hometown Heroes (2006)
Larry Walker – voted by MLB fans as the most outstanding player in the history of the franchise, based on on-field performance, leadership quality and character value

Team award
 – Warren Giles Trophy (National League champion)
2007 – Baseball America Organization of the Year

Team records (single-game, single-season, career)

Championships

| colspan="3" style="text-align:center;"| National League Champions
|-
| style="width:30%; text-align:center;"| Preceded by:St. Louis Cardinals
| style="width:40%; text-align:center;"| 2007
| style="width:30%; text-align:center;"| Succeeded by:Philadelphia Phillies
|-
| colspan="3" style="text-align:center;"| National League Wild Card Winners
|-
| style="width:30%; text-align:center;"| Preceded by:None (First)
| style="width:40%; text-align:center;"| 1995
| style="width:30%; text-align:center;"| Succeeded by:Los Angeles Dodgers
|-
| style="width:30%; text-align:center;"| Preceded by:Los Angeles Dodgers
| style="width:40%; text-align:center;"| 2007
| style="width:30%; text-align:center;"| Succeeded by:Milwaukee Brewers
|-
| style="width:30%; text-align:center;"| Preceded by:Milwaukee Brewers
| style="width:40%; text-align:center;"| 2009
| style="width:30%; text-align:center;"| Succeeded by:Atlanta Braves
|-
| style="width:30%; text-align:center;"| Preceded by:Arizona Diamondbacks
| style="width:40%; text-align:center;"| 2018
| style="width:30%; text-align:center;"| Succeeded by:Washington Nationals
|-
| colspan="3" style="text-align:center;"| National League Wild Card Runner-Up
|-
|
| style="width:40%; text-align:center;"| 2017
|
|-

Roster

Home attendance

The Rockies led MLB attendance records for the first seven years of their existence. The inaugural season is currently the MLB all-time record for home attendance.

+ = 57 home games in strike shortened season. ++ = 72 home games in strike shortened season.

Minor league affiliations

The Colorado Rockies farm system consists of seven minor league affiliates.

Radio and television

As of 2010, Rockies' flagship radio station is KOA 850AM, with some late-season games broadcast on KHOW 630 AM due to conflicts with Denver Broncos games. The Rockies Radio Network is composed of 38 affiliate stations in eight states.

As of 2019, Jack Corrigan and Jerry Schemmel are the radio announcers, serving as a backup TV announcer whenever Drew Goodman is not available.

In January 2020, long-time KOA radio announcer Jerry Schemmel was let go from his role for budgetary reasons from KOA’s parent company. He returned in 2022, replacing Mike Rice, who reportedly refused the COVID-19 vaccine. 

As of 2013, Spanish language radio broadcasts of the Rockies are heard on KNRV 1150 AM.

As of 2013, all games are produced and televised by AT&T SportsNet Rocky Mountain. All 150 games produced by AT&T SportsNet Rocky Mountain are broadcast in HD. Jeff Huson and Drew Goodman are the usual TV broadcast team, with Ryan Spilborghs and Kelsey Wingert handling on-field coverage and clubhouse interviews. Jenny Cavnar, Jason Hirsh, and Cory Sullivan handle the pre-game and post-game shows. Corrigan, Spilborghs, Cavnar, and Sullivan also fill in as play-by-play or color commentator during absences of Huson or Goodman.

References

External links

 
 Minor League Affiliates of the Colorado Rockies

 
Major League Baseball teams
Baseball teams established in 1993
Cactus League
Professional baseball teams in Colorado
1993 establishments in Colorado